Events in the year 2018 in Malta.

Incumbents
 President: Marie-Louise Coleiro Preca
 Prime Minister: Joseph Muscat

Events
12 January – the restored Triton Fountain is inaugurated.

9-13 February - The 2018 Carnival is held.

Deaths

3 January – Francis George Adeodatus Micallef, Roman Catholic prelate (b. 1928).

5 January – Emanuel Barbara, Roman Catholic prelate (b. 1949).

20 January – Sylvester Carmel Magro, Roman Catholic prelate (b. 1941)

12 May – Charles Thake, actor (b. 1927).

16 July – Gabriel Caruana, artist (b. 1929).

References

 
2010s in Malta
Years of the 21st century in Malta
Malta
Malta